The 2018–19 Luxembourg Cup was the 94th edition of the football knockout tournament in the country. The winners of the cup this season earned a place in the 2019–20 Europa League. The competition began on 5 September 2018 and ended on 26 May 2019.

Racing FC were the defending champions after winning the previous season's Luxembourg Cup final over Hostert on penalties.

Teams

Preliminary round
Four preliminary round matches were played 5 September 2018. The draw for the preliminary and first rounds was held 6 August 2018. Four teams each from tiers 5 (3. Division) and 4 (2. Division) took part.

First round
Thirty-six first round matches were played 7–12 September 2018. The draw for the preliminary and first rounds was held 6 August 2018. Seventeen teams from the lowest tier (5th level 3. Division) took part in this round.

Second round
Thirty-two second round matches were played between 21 and 23 September 2018. The draw for the second round was held 10 September 2018. Three teams from the fifth tier (3. Division) took part in this round: Colmar-Berg, Moutfort-Medingen, and Bourscheid.

Third round
Sixteen third round matches were played 27–28 October 2018. The draw for the third round was held 24 September 2018. Bourscheid are the only remaining team competing from the lowest tier (5th tier 3. Division).

Fourth round
The draw for the fourth round was held 5 November 2018. Seven of the eight matches were played on 9 December 2018  and the remaining match between Blue Boys Muhlenbach and Attert Bissen was played on 17 February 2019. Sporting Bertrange were the lowest ranked team left in the competition, competing in the third tier (1. Division).

Quarter-final
The draw for the quarter final was held 13 November 2018 with the four matches played on 3 April 2019. Two teams from the second tier (Luxembourg Division of Honour) were still in the competition: Union Mertert-Wasserbillig and Blue Boys Muhlenbach.

Semi-final
The draw for the semi final was held 5 April 2019. Of the four remaining teams, only one team from outside the top flight (second tier Luxembourg Division of Honour) remained in the competition at this stage, Union Mertert-Wasserbillig.

Final

See also
 2018–19 Luxembourg National Division

References

External links
uefa.com
FLF

2018-19
Luxembourg
Cup